Trypsin domain containing 1 is a protein that in humans is encoded by the TYSND1 gene.

Function

This gene encodes a protease that removes the N-terminal peroxisomal targeting signal (PTS2) from proteins produced in the cytosol, thereby facilitating their import into the peroxisome. 

The encoded protein is also capable of cleaving several proteins targeted to peroxisomes through the C-terminal peroxisomal targeting signal (PTS1). The full-length protein undergoes self-cleavage to produce shorter, potentially inactive fragments. Alternative splicing results in multiple transcript variants for this gene.

References

Further reading